Trachyderma is a genus of fungi in the family Ganodermataceae.

References

Ganodermataceae
Polyporales genera